Acantholimon karamanicum is a species of flowering plant. It grows on calcareous mountain slopes in Ermenek.

References

karamanicum